Jarad Klein (born 1981) is the Iowa State Representative from the 78th District.  A Republican, he has served in the Iowa House of Representatives since 2011.  Klein was born in Keota, Iowa.

, Klein serves on several committees in the Iowa House – the Environmental Protection, Labor, and Public Safety committees.  He also serves as the Vice Chair of the Agriculture committee and as the Vice Chair of the Agriculture and Natural Resources Appropriations Subcommittee.

Electoral history 
Klein won 68.86% of votes (2,085) over Chris Canny during the District 89 Iowa House of Representatives primary elections in 2010. During the general elections, he defeated incumbent Democrat Larry Marek with 52.28% of the vote (6,339). During the 2012 Iowa House of Representatives primary elections, he won the Republican nomination as the incumbent over Priscilla Marlar with 75.51% of the vote (2,310). District 87 was redistricted ahead of Iowa's 2012 House of Representatives elections and Klein held onto his seat unopposed.

References

External links 

Representative Jarad Klein official Iowa General Assembly site
Profile at Iowa House Republicans

1981 births
Farmers from Iowa
Republican Party members of the Iowa House of Representatives
Living people
People from Washington County, Iowa
People from Keota, Iowa
21st-century American politicians